Kolathur is a medium-sized town  in Salem district in the Indian state of Tamil Nadu. It is located near Mettur and surrounded by Cavery river.

Demographics

Population 
As of 2011 India census, Kolathur is a Town Panchayat city in district of Salem, Tamil Nadu. Kolathur city is divided into 15 wards for which elections are held every 5 years. The Kolathur Town Panchayat has population of 12,748 of which 6,513 are males while 6,235 are females as per report released by Census India 2011.

Population of children with age of 0-6 is 1128 which is 8.85% of total population of Kolathur (TP). In Kolathur Town Panchayat, Female Sex Ratio is of 957 against state average of 996. Moreover, Child Sex Ratio in Kolathur is around 982 compared to Tamil Nadu state average of 943. Literacy rate of Kolathur city is 72.81% lower than state average of 80.09%. In Kolathur, Male literacy is around 80.64% while female literacy rate is 64.62%.

Government and politics

Civic Administration  
 
Kolathur Town panchayat has over 3,413 houses to which it supplies basic amenities like water and sewerage. It is also authorized to build roads within the panchayat limits and impose taxes on properties coming under its jurisdiction.

Economy 
The market is held only on Fridays. There the agriculturists from surrounding areas sell their products and their cattle.

People visit during Sundays for buying fish and entertainment.  There are more people who depend on agriculture than other business around Kolathur.  
 
Out of total population, 5,566 were engaged in work or business activity. Of this 3,722 were males while 1,844 were females. In census survey, worker is defined as person who does business, job, service, and cultivator and labour activity. Of total 5566 working population, 96.69% were engaged in Main Work while 3.31% of total workers were engaged in Marginal Work.

Culture/Cityscape

Tourist attractions 
The Pannavadi Parisal Thurai is a popular tourist spot.

Adjacent communities
The nearby villages are Pannavadi, Moolakadu, Neethipuram, Karungaloor, Periyar nagar Kaveripuram,Thinnappatti.

References

External links
 Kolathur Population Census 2011

Cities and towns in Salem district